The Female Voluntary Corps for Auxiliary Services of the Republican Armed Forces (Italian: Corpo Femminile Volontario per i Servizi Ausiliari delle Forze Armate Repubblicane, better known as the Female Auxiliary Service (Italian: Servizio Ausiliario Femminile SAF ) was a women's corps of the armed forces of the Italian Social Republic, whose components, all voluntary, were commonly referred to as auxiliaries.

History
On 18 April 1944, the Female Auxiliary Service was established, under the command of Piera Gatteschi Fondelli. The auxiliaries initially provided only nursing assistance in military hospitals, work in offices and propaganda, and set up mobile refreshment places for the troops. In the space of twelve months 6,000 young women participate in six training courses, in Venice and Como; only then were they assigned to the Commands. After April 25, 1945 the Female Auxiliary Service was dissolved and Pavolini suggested destroying all documentation to avoid reprisals against members.

Ranks

See also
 Italian Campaign (World War II)
 Italian Co-Belligerent Army
 Military history of Italy during World War II
 Royal Italian Army
 Women in the military

References

External links
 History of the RSI Female Auxiliary Service (in Italian)
 RSI Armed Forces, including the Female Auxiliary Service (in Italian)

All-female military units and formations
Military units and formations of Italy in World War II
Italian Army (pre-1946)
Military units and formations established in 1943
1944 establishments in Italy
Italian Social Republic
Women in war
History of women in Italy